Dougal or Doogal may refer to:

People 
 Dougal (given name)
 DJ Dougal, a happy hardcore artist
 Jim Dougal, Northern Irish journalist
 Jimmy Dougal (1913–1999), a Scottish footballer
 Margaret Douie Dougal (1858-1938), British chemical publication indexer
 Samuel Herbert Dougal, murderer known for womanising and forgery
 Stuart Dougal, Scottish football referee

Fictional characters 
 Dougal, the dog in the BBC (and ORTF) television series The Magic Roundabout (and its spin-offs)
 The Magic Roundabout (film), a 2005 film adaption of the television series, known as Doogal in North America
 Father Dougal McGuire, a fictional character in Father Ted
 Dougal MacKenzie in the 1991 Outlander novel and TV series

Other 
 Dougal (steam locomotive)

See also
Dougall
Dugal